Batuhan Avcı (born 2 August 2000) is a Turkish male volleyball player. He is part of the Turkey men's national volleyball team. On club level he plays for Arkas Spor.

Career
On August 13, 2020, Galatasaray signed a 2-year contract with young spiker Avcı.

References

External links
Player profile at Galatasaray.org
Player profile at Volleybox.net

2000 births
Living people
Volleyball players from Istanbul
Turkish men's volleyball players
Galatasaray S.K. (men's volleyball) players
Beşiktaş volleyballers
İstanbul Büyükşehir Belediyespor volleyballers
Arkas Spor volleyball players
21st-century Turkish people